The J.R.R. Tolkien Lecture on Fantasy Literature is a free public lecture delivered annually at Pembroke College, Oxford University.

The series was founded by Pembroke postgraduate students Will Badger and Gabriel Schenk in memory of J.R.R. Tolkien, who was Rawlinson and Bosworth Professor of Anglo-Saxon at Pembroke from 1925 until 1945. During this time he wrote The Hobbit and the majority of The Lord of the Rings. The aim of the lecture series is to stimulate more serious study of fantasy literature at Oxford University and beyond. The lecture can be on any subject dealing with fantasy, science fiction, horror, or related speculative genres.

The Pembroke College Middle Common Room announced the series in 2012, and the first lecture was delivered on 18 January 2013 by fantasy writer Kij Johnson.

R.F. Kuang was scheduled to deliver the eighth-annual lecture in April 2020, but due to the COVID-19 pandemic, her lecture was postponed. On 16 May 2020, in lieu of a lecture, past speakers Kij Johnson, Adam Roberts, Lev Grossman, Terri Windling, and Victoria 'V.E.' Schwab joined forthcoming lecturer Kuang for an online symposium on 'Fantasy in Times of Crisis'. The organizers invited donations to the Society of Authors' emergency fund to support British writers whose livelihoods had been affected by the pandemic.

Guy Gavriel Kay delivered the 2021 lecture on 11 May. It was held digitally via Zoom and streamed live to YouTube. In 2022, the Tolkien Lecture was held in person again, with R.F. Kuang delivering the lecture at Pembroke on 23 May.

Science Fiction critic, writer, and publisher Cheryl Morgan regularly blogs about the lecture series on her website. Fantasy author Juliet E. McKenna has also written about the series.

History

References

External links
 Official Website
 Press Release for the launch of the series
 Pembroke College, Oxford, Official Website

Tolkien
Tolkien studies
Science fiction studies
Speculative fiction
Annual events in England
Fantasy organizations
Recurring events established in 2013